Blockhouse is an unincorporated community in Klickitat County, in the U.S. state of Washington.

History
Blockhouse had its start in the 1850s when a military fort was built near the town site. and was used during the Yakima War. A post office called Blockhouse was established in 1872, and remained in operation until 1930.

References

Unincorporated communities in Klickitat County, Washington
Unincorporated communities in Washington (state)